The Mercedes-AMG F1 W12 E Performance, commonly abbreviated as the Mercedes W12, was a Formula One racing car designed and constructed by the Mercedes-AMG Petronas Formula One Team under the direction of James Allison to compete in the 2021 Formula One World Championship. The car was driven by Lewis Hamilton and Valtteri Bottas. The car is based on the Mercedes-AMG F1 W11 EQ Performance which won the Drivers' and Constructors' Championships the previous season.

Whilst the W12 won the team's eighth consecutive constructors' title, this was the first Mercedes F1 car since V6 turbo-hybrid era started in 2014 with which Mercedes failed to win the Drivers' Championship with either driver with Hamilton finishing 2nd in the standings.

Design
The W12, whilst still highly competitive, was not as dominant as its predecessor either in pre-season testing or at the 2021 Bahrain Grand Prix. The regulation changes designed to reduce downforce produced by the floor area are said to have compromised lower rake designs, like the W12, more than higher rake designs like that of Red Bull RB16B, along with the banning of the DAS system. Pundits Lawrence Barretto, Scott Mitchell,  Mark Hughes and Edd Straw made Red Bull favourites for the first race of the year due to a stronger performance than Mercedes during testing. Although Verstappen did beat the Mercedes cars of Hamilton (2nd) and Bottas (3rd) to pole at the season opener, Hamilton narrowly won from Verstappen, with Bottas finishing third. Williams driver and Mercedes protégé George Russell (who drove the W12's predecessor, the W11, at the 2020 Sakhir Grand Prix) suggested that the W12 and the Williams FW43B could have issues with wind sensitivity and could explain the struggles of Mercedes relative to Red Bull in Bahrain.

Season summary
Opening rounds

In the season opener at the Bahrain Grand Prix, Hamilton qualified in second place behind Verstappen. When the race got underway, Verstappen managed to stay ahead of Hamilton, but Mercedes decided to undercut Verstappen by pitting Hamilton for hard tyres at the end of lap 14, and eventually won the race. In the Emilia Romagna Grand Prix, Hamilton achieved his 99th pole position, ahead of Sergio Pérez and Verstappen. In the race, Verstappen started well and overtook Hamilton for first place, Hamilton briefly regained the lead only to lose it again to Verstappen after Hamilton pitted. On lap 31, Hamilton went off-track and through the gravel trap, rejoining in eighth position. A red flag soon followed after a crash between Bottas and George Russell. After a rolling start, Hamilton made a lot of overtakes to finish in second position, over 20 seconds behind the eventual race winner, Verstappen.

At the Portuguese Grand Prix, Valtteri Bottas qualified on pole ahead of Hamilton. Bottas kept the lead of the race onto turn 1, Later both Hamilton and Verstappen overtook Bottas, Hamilton maintained the lead to win the race over 29 seconds ahead of Verstappen. Hamilton achieved his 100th pole position at the Spanish Grand Prix, at the start of the race, Verstappen took the lead from him onto turn 1. Verstappen's first pit stop was slower and Red Bull decided to stay on a one-stop strategy. On lap 59, Hamilton got past Verstappen for the lead and went onto win the Spanish Grand Prix. In the Monaco Grand Prix, Hamilton experienced the worst qualifying session since the 2018 German Grand Prix because of a tyre temperature issue, only managed to qualify seventh position. Issues continued into race day, and he couldn't get past anyone. But made a late pit stop to set a fastest lap and finished the race seventh, while Bottas retired when the team was unable to remove a wheel during a routine pitstop. At the Azerbaijan Grand Prix, Hamilton qualified second ahead of third-placed Verstappen, while Bottas qualified in 10th place, after a red flag prevented him and other drivers from setting a second flying lap in the third and final session, but both drivers failed to finish in the points since the 2012 United States Grand Prix. At the French Grand Prix, Hamilton qualified behind Verstappen for the race. In the opening lap, Hamilton took the lead as Verstappen made a mistake, Hamilton made his first pit stop on lap 19, one lap later than Verstappen. In doing so, Hamilton lost the lead to Verstappen, because of Verstappen's undercut performed with those newer tyres. On lap 32, Verstappen pitted for the second time, but Mercedes decided to keep Hamilton out in a one-stop strategy. With five laps remaining, Verstappen took the lead and went onto win the race just 3 seconds ahead of Hamilton, while Bottas finished 4th after being passed by Perez.  

Mid season rounds 

At the Styrian Grand Prix and Austrian Grand Prix, it was a Red bull dominance as Verstappen took both pole positions. In both races, both drivers struggled with race pace, but managed to be on the podium, with Hamilton finishing 2nd in Styrian, and Bottas taking 3rd in Styrian and 2nd In Austrian. This led Verstappen to increase his championship lead by 32 points as he achieved his first grand slam. At the British Grand Prix, Mercedes introduced a huge upgrade package to increase the car's competitiveness. Hamilton qualified on pole for the first sprint race, while Bottas qualified 3rd. In the sprint, Verstappen made a better start than Hamilton and overtook him before the first corner, leading every lap and winning the sprint with Hamilton second and Bottas third, thus Verstappen started on pole for the Grand Prix itself. In the race, Hamilton made a better start over Verstappen and both contested each other for the lead during the first half of the opening lap. Both repeatedly swapped positions until the Copse corner, where Hamilton's car understeered and collided with Verstappen, who hit the wall by going sideways across the gravel, while Hamilton was slowed down and allowed Leclerc to take the lead of the race. Due to Verstappen's crash, the race was red flagged. The race was resumed after fifteen minutes as Hamilton was given a ten-second time penalty, with stewards ruling that Hamilton was predominantly, but not fully, at fault in the collision. Hamilton remained at second position after the restart, pitted and served his time penalty to rejoin fourth. Hamilton immediately overtook Norris and Bottas to claim back second position, took the lead of the race on lap 50, as Leclerc struggled with an engine issue of his car. Hamilton won his record equalling eighth British Grand Prix.  

Hamilton qualified on pole for the Hungarian Grand Prix, which was the first Mercedes front row lockout of the season. The race started on damp conditions, at turn 1 some drivers collided on each other, with Bottas involved in it. The safety car was bought out, after two laps behind the safety car, the race was red-flagged. The restart saw Hamilton being the only driver in the grid at the restart while rest of the grid pitted for slick tyres and was forced to start from the pit lane. Hamilton made his first pit stop by the end of the lap 4, letting Estaban Ocon to lead of the race. Hamilton made his made his second pit stop on lap 19 for Hard compound tyres, which allowed to undercut Verstappen and Daniel Riccardo, Hamilton fought his way up to fourth position and then pitted on lap 48 to come out behind Fernando Alonso. Hamilton was held behind Alonso for twelve laps, but finally got past Alonso as he locked up his brakes and ran wide at turn 1 on lap 53. Hamilton caught up to Sainz and overtook him to take third position on lap 67 and finished the race behind Ocon and Sebastian Vettel, though was promoted to second after Vettel's disqualification. Both Hamilton and Mercedes took the championship lead from Verstappen and Red Bull respectively. Verstappen took pole from Russell and Hamilton in the Belgian Grand Prix in a wet qualifying session. The race was heavily affected by rain, which initially saw the start delayed by 25 minutes. After two formation laps behind the safety car, the race start was suspended and red-flagged due to poor conditions and lack of visibility. A nearly three-hour delay followed before the race was resumed. After a further three laps, the race was red-flagged again. It was not restarted, becoming the shortest race in Formula 1 history and the sixth to award half-points as less than 75% of the race was completed. Verstappen won by default, with Russell in second and Hamilton in third place. It was Russell's first podium in Formula 1. As a result, Hamilton's lead in the championship was cut to three points from Verstappen.  Hamilton qualified in second position for the Dutch Grand Prix, just 0.038 seconds behind Verstappen. Hamilton set the fastest lap and finished race in second position behind the home race winner, Verstappen and again lost the championship lead. Bottas came third, overtaking Norris, who finished tenth.  

At the Italian Grand Prix, Hamilton qualified in second position for the sprint race, just 0.096 seconds behind Bottas. Hamilton seemed to have struggling during the sprint race, already lost four positions at turn 2, but made up one place to finish fifth at the end of the race. Hamilton was promoted to the fourth position, as Bottas had to start the race from back of the grid due to exceeding the quota of power unit components. However, Verstappen and Hamilton collided during the race on lap 24, which saw Hamilton's first retirement since the 2018 Austrian Grand Prix, and Bottas went on to finish 3rd behind the two Mclaren drivers of Ricciardo and Norris. Hamilton was the fastest in Q1 and Q2 during qualifying at the Russian Grand Prix, but wasn't unable to set a faster lap time in Q3, due to making contact with the pit wall while on the way to change his tyres to slicks. Resulting a front wing damage and he couldn't get his tyres up to temperature as he was forced to slow down to let go those cars which were on flying laps. Also, lack of time left till the end of the session saw Hamilton qualifying fourth for the race. Hamilton had a bad start, lost six positions before heading into turn 1, Hamilton overtook Alonso in the following lap. On lap 48, rain began to fall as Hamilton immediately pitted for Intermediate tyres while the race leader, Norris stayed out in racing. On lap 51, despite stayed out in racing on slick tyres, Norris ran wide at turn 5, allowing Hamilton to take the lead of the and achieve a century of wins in Formula One, as well as the championship lead from Verstappen.   

Closing Rounds 

Hamilton was the fastest in qualifying in Turkey, but was dropped down the grid because of a penalty due to a power unit component change. Valtteri Bottas was promoted to pole position and won the race, his first of 2021. Hamilton was forced to make a late pit stop, which cost him couple of places to finish the race in fifth position. In doing so Hamilton was frustrated and lost his championship lead again to Verstappen. At the United States Grand Prix, Hamilton qualified in second position, just behind Verstappen for the race. Hamilton took lead from him onto turn 1, but lost it after the pit stops, Hamilton finished race in second position, just 1.3 seconds behind Verstappen, also set the fastest lap of the race. Bottas qualified 4th but was forced to take yet another engine penalty, thus starting 9th. Bottas struggled with dirty air throughout the race, which made overtaking difficult, but he managed to climb back to 6th after overtaking the Ferrari of Carlos Sainz on the last lap. Hamilton qualified in second position again for the Mexico City Grand Prix, but this time Bottas was on pole position. Verstappen immediately took the lead of the race onto turn 1 from Bottas, where he suffered a poor start in the race and was tagged by Daniel Ricciardo going into Turn 1, sending him to the back of the field. Having suffered from a poor pitstop and being stuck behind Ricciardo for much of the race, he was pit by Mercedes to take the fastest lap off Verstappen, thus maintaining Mercedes' lead over Red Bull in the constructors' championship.. Hamilton stood behind Verstappen for the entire race, and managed to secure second from Pérez, who was chasing close behind him.  

In the São Paulo Grand Prix, Hamilton qualified on pole position, half a second ahead of second-placed Verstappen. After the session, stewards claimed his car's DRS opening slot was larger than the permitted 85 millimeters. As a result, Hamilton was forced to start from the back of the grid for the sprint. In the sprint race, Hamilton started from back and made up fifteen places to finish the race fifth just from 24 laps. But he was dropped to the tenth position for the race start, due to taking another new engine for the race. In the race, Hamilton caught up race-leading Verstappen by lap 48, Hamilton tried to get past Verstappen, but was pushed wide by Verstappen and stewards claimed no investigation necessary for his aggressive move. On lap 59, Hamilton finally got past Verstappen to win the race. Bottas meanwhile jumped Verstappen at the start, and he went on to win the sprint race. In the race, Bottas was passed by both Red Bulls on the opening lap after contact with Verstappen. Bottas let Hamilton past and re-overtook Pérez during the pitstop phase, ending the race in third. Hamilton qualified on pole position for the Qatar Grand Prix, which took place for the first time in the Formula One calendar. Hamilton led every single lap in the race, won 25 seconds ahead of second-placed Verstappen. This was Hamilton's 30th different circuit where he has won a Grand Prix. The Saudi Arabian Grand Prix was another rookie Grand Prix for the Formula One calendar. Hamilton set the pole position lap in his first attempt, in the second one he was unable to improve his time as he had a slide, forcing him to abort his flying lap. But his effort was enough to qualify on pole position, as Verstappen also aborted his second flying lap due to a mistake. On lap 37 of the race, Hamilton caught up to Verstappen and tried to overtake him at turn 1, Verstappen defended by going of the track, almost crashing onto Hamilton. In the same lap, Verstappen was told to give back his position to Hamilton, but Hamilton wasn't informed and as soon as Verstappen slowed down to let him go, Hamilton crashed onto the back of Verstappen's car, as a result Hamilton slightly damaged his front wing of the car. Verstappen was given a ten-second time penalty for slowing down in the middle of the track. On lap 42, Verstappen finally let Hamilton get past, but immediately overtook Hamilton in the following corner, which wasn't allowed. On lap 43, Hamilton got past Verstappen to win the first ever Saudi Arabian Grand Prix, also set the fastest lap of the race. This result allowed both championship contenders level on points to head onto the final race of the season. 

The Abu Dhabi Grand Prix was the title decider of the season, which ended up in controversy. Hamilton qualified in second position, behind Verstappen, who was slipstreamed by his teammate to snatch pole position. In the race, Hamilton overtook Verstappen with a better start at turn 1, but Verstappen tried to take back his position at turn 6, in doing so pushed Hamilton wide and forced him cut the chicane. Red Bull immediately reported as Hamilton has gained an advantage from it, but the steward refused it and claimed no investigation necessary. Hamilton made his first pit stop to change onto Hard compound tyres on lap 14, one lap later than Verstappen, which let Pérez in the lead. Red Bull informed Pérez to hold up Hamilton, to allow Verstappen to close the gap, in doing so the gap between the championship rivals has become down onto 1.3 seconds from 11 seconds. But Verstappen was unable to make advantage of it, as Hamilton took the lead from Pérez and extended the gap between Verstappen. On lap 35, Antonio Giovinazzi retired from the race, which caused a virtual safety car period, Verstappen gained advantage from it, as pitted for newer tyres. Mercedes decided to keep Hamilton racing, to prevent losing the lead to his rival. Hamilton comfortably led the race with a significant gap between Verstappen, on lap 53, Nicholas Latifi crashed onto the wall at turn 14, despite battling with Schumacher. As a result, the safety car was bought out, Mercedes decided again to keep Hamilton in racing, while Verstappen pitted for fresh Soft compound tyres, in doing so five of the lapped cars stood between the title contenders. Race director, Michael Masi decided to prevent all of the lapped cars from overtaking the race leader, Hamilton. But after the incident was cleared there was enough time to let the cars between Hamilton and Verstappen pass. Masi decided to restart the race, after letting five lapped cars between Hamilton and Verstappen to unlap themselves. In doing so, Verstappen was just behind Hamilton with fresh soft compound tyres, to go on racing only for the final lap. As a result, Verstappen got past Hamilton at turn 5, almost colliding with Hamilton in an unexpected overtake attempt. Hamilton tried to gain his position back but was unsuccessful due to Verstappen's tyre advantage and better positioning into the corner. Hamilton crossed the finish line in second position, losing the chance to claim a record breaking eighth World Driver's Championship. Mercedes won their eighth consecutive World Constructor's Championship. Hamilton claimed the race result was "manipulated" via team radio to his senior race engineer, Peter Bonnington, a few of the drivers claimed Masi's decision "made for TV" and criticised him for the safety car controversy and allegedly not following the rules correctly. However no rules were found by the FIA to be breached by Masi, to which safety car rules would be clarified for the 2022 season along with removing the single race director role. Mercedes appeals were rejected, giving Verstappen his maiden title and Hamilton staying on Seven world championships. Many fans believed Hamilton should have won his eighth title however many also argued other events such as the British GP, where Hamilton received a 10 second time penalty for taking Verstappen out of the race, should have been harsher towards Hamilton who still ended up winning the race, which would have effected the championship standings.

Complete Formula One results
(key)

Notes
 Half points awarded as less than 75% of race distance completed.

References

External links
 Official website

F1 W12 E Performance
2021 Formula One season cars
Formula One championship-winning cars